Thomas G. O'Donnell (30 August 1926 – 8 October 2020) was an Irish Fine Gael politician who served as Minister for the Gaeltacht from 1973 to 1977. He served as a Teachta Dála (TD) for the Limerick East from 1961 to 1987. He also served as a Member of the European Parliament (MEP) for the Munster constituency from 1979 to 1989.

Career
He was born in Charleville, County Cork, in 1926. He was educated at the Crescent College, Salesian College and University College Dublin, where he received a Bachelor of Arts degree. He worked as a teacher and a voluntary community activist before becoming involved in politics.

O'Donnell was first elected to Dáil Éireann at the 1961 general election as a Fine Gael TD for Limerick East. He was Opposition Front Bench spokesperson on Transport, Power and Tourism from 1969 to 1973. He served in the government on one occasion in the National Coalition under Taoiseach Liam Cosgrave between 1973 and 1977 as Minister for the Gaeltacht. He was Opposition Front Bench spokesperson on Telecommunications from 1977 to 1979. O'Donnell was elected to the European Parliament at the 1979 election, and served until 1984. He retired from national politics following the 1987 general election at which he lost his seat. He was spokesperson on Regional Policy for the European People's Party (EPP) from 1979 to 1989.

After his retirement from politics he became actively involved in the voluntary sector. He was Chairperson of the Irish Peace Institute at the University of Limerick, Chairperson of the PAUL Partnership, Chairperson to the Limerick City and County Strategy Group and the Limerick Employment Pact.

In 2005, he was honoured by Limerick City Council with a civic reception and a special presentation to mark half a century of his political and voluntary services to the people of Limerick City and County.

He was married to Helen O'Connor from Sligo, former Honorary National Secretary of Fine Gael; they have one son. His uncle Richard O'Connell was a Cumann na nGaedheal TD for Limerick from 1924 to 1932, and his nephew Kieran O'Donnell is a Fine Gael TD for Limerick City.

O'Donnell died in October 2020 at the age of 94.

See also
Families in the Oireachtas

References

External links

Tom O'Donnell in 'Politicians' file at Limerick City Library, Ireland

 

1926 births
2020 deaths
Fine Gael TDs
Members of the 17th Dáil
Members of the 18th Dáil
Members of the 19th Dáil
Members of the 20th Dáil
Members of the 21st Dáil
Members of the 22nd Dáil
Members of the 23rd Dáil
Members of the 24th Dáil
Politicians from County Limerick
Fine Gael MEPs
MEPs for the Republic of Ireland 1984–1989
MEPs for the Republic of Ireland 1979–1984
People educated at Crescent College
Alumni of University College Dublin